Kamilla Steiwer (née Olaussen; born 1993) is a Norwegian orienteering competitor who represents the club Fredrikstad SK.

Career
Competing at the 2018 World Orienteering Championships in Latvia, Steiwer placed fourth in the relay with the Norwegian team, and 
5th in the long distance. At the 2019 World Orienteering Championships in Østfold, Norway, she placed fourth in the relay, 16th in the middle distance, and 13th in the long distance.

She competed at the 2021 World Orienteering Championships in the Czech Republic, where she placed fourth in the middle distance after a close fight for the bronze medal, two seconds behind Simona Aebersold. She won a bronze medal in the relay with the Norwegian team, together with Marie Olaussen and Andrine Benjaminsen.

Personal life
She is a sister of Marie Olaussen and in a relationship with Gaute Hallan Steiwer, and sister-in-law of Kine Hallan Steiwer.

References

 

1993 births
Living people
Norwegian orienteers
Female orienteers
Foot orienteers
21st-century Norwegian women